James Albert Attwood Jr. is an American businessman. He serves as a Senior Advisor to The Carlyle Group and chairman of Nielsen Holdings PLC. He is a former investment banker at Goldman Sachs and EVP of Verizon Communications. He was a major donor to Hillary Clinton's 2016 presidential campaign.

Early life and education
Attwood is the son of Pauline Attwood, former director of the Bronxville Adult School, and James A. Attwood, former chairman and chief executive of the Mutual Life Insurance Company of New York.

Attwood graduated summa cum laude from Yale University where he earned a BA in applied mathematics and a MA in statistics in 1980. He then attended Harvard University, and earned a J.D. from Harvard Law School and an M.B.A. from Harvard Business School in 1984.

Career
Attwood started his career as an investment banker for Goldman Sachs, where he worked in New York City and Tokyo for eleven years. He subsequently served as the Executive Vice President for Strategy, Development and Planning for Verizon Communications and the GTE Corporation for four years. He joined The Carlyle Group in 2000, where he is a Senior Advisor. Between 2000 and 2017 he directed Carlyle's private equity investments in the media and telecommunications industries globally, and between 2014 and 2017 he directed the firm's investments in the technology industry as well.

Attwood joined the board of directors of Nielsen Holdings in 2006 and was appointed its chairman in 2016. He also serves as chairman of the board of directors of Syniverse.

Attwood joined the Dean's Advisory Board for Harvard Law School in 2000. He currently serves as chair of the Caramoor Center for Music and the Arts in Katonah, New York  and sits on the boards of WNET and The Nature Conservancy.

Political activity
Attwood donated to Correct the Record, a Super PAC which supports Hillary Clinton's 2016 presidential campaign. He also donated to Priorities USA Action, another pro-Hillary Clinton Super PAC, in 2016, as well as to the Hillary Victory Fund and Hillary for America.

Personal life
Attwood and his wife, Leslie Kim Williams, met at Harvard Law School, where they both graduated in the class of 1984. They have one daughter, Samantha Kim Attwood. They reside in Bedford Hills, New York and Martha's Vineyard.

References

Living people
People from Bedford Hills, New York
People from Martha's Vineyard, Massachusetts
Yale College alumni
Harvard Business School alumni
American investment bankers
American corporate directors
Goldman Sachs people
The Carlyle Group people
American chairpersons of corporations
Date of birth missing (living people)
Harvard Law School alumni
Year of birth missing (living people)
Yale Graduate School of Arts and Sciences alumni